The 1997 European Indoors was a women's tennis tournament played on indoor hard courts at the Schluefweg in Zürich in Switzerland that was part of Tier I of the 1997 WTA Tour. It was the 14th edition of the tournament and was held from 12 October until 19 October 1997. Lindsay Davenport won the singles title.

Finals

Singles

 Lindsay Davenport defeated  Nathalie Tauziat 7–6, 7–5
 It was Davenport's 11th title of the year and the 29th of her career.

Doubles

 Martina Hingis /  Arantxa Sánchez Vicario defeated  Larisa Savchenko /  Helena Suková 4–6, 6–4, 6–1
 It was Hingis' 19th title of the year and the 25th of her career. It was Sánchez Vicario's 6th title of the year and the 79th of her career.

External links
 ITF tournament edition details
 Tournament draws

European Indoors
Zurich Open
1997 in Swiss women's sport
1997 in Swiss tennis